Dunaharaszti is a town in Pest County, Budapest metropolitan area, Hungary. It has a population of around 20,000 people.

Twin towns – sister cities

Dunaharaszti is twinned with:
 Altdorf bei Nürnberg, Germany

Sport
Dunaharaszti MTK, association football club

Notable people
Sunny Lax, trance music producer

Gallery

References

External links

 in Hungarian
Street map 

Populated places in Pest County
Budapest metropolitan area
Hungarian German communities